The 1979 Davison's Classic was a women's singles tennis tournament played on indoor carpet courts at the Alexander Memorial Coliseum in Atlanta, Georgia in the United States. The event was part of the AAA category of the 1979 Colgate Series. It was the fourth edition of the tournament and was held from September 23 through September 29, 1979. First-seeded Martina Navratilova won the singles title and earned $20,000 first-prize money.

Finals

Singles
 Martina Navratilova defeated  Wendy Turnbull 7–6(8–6), 6–4
It was Navratilova's 8th title of the year and the 32nd of her career.

Doubles
 Betty Stöve /  Wendy Turnbull defeated  Ann Kiyomura /  Anne Smith 6–2, 6–4

Prize money

Notes

References

External links
 International Tennis Federation (ITF) tournament edition details
  Women's Tennis Association (WTA) tournament edition details

Davison's Classic
Davison's Classic
Tennis tournaments in Georgia (U.S. state)
Davison's Classic
Davison's Classic